The O'Day 19 is an American trailerable sailboat that was designed by John Deknatel of C. Raymond Hunt Associates, as a racer-cruiser and first built in 1979.

The O'Day 19 was replaced by the O'Day 192 in the company's product line.

Production
The design was built by the O'Day Corp., at that time, part of Bangor Punta Corp., in the United States. Production ran from 1979 until 1982.

Design
The O'Day 19 is a recreational keelboat, built predominantly of fiberglass. It has a fractional sloop rig, a raked stem, a slightly reverse transom, a transom-hung rudder controlled by a tiller and a fixed stub keel, with a centerboard.

The boat is normally fitted with a small  outboard motor for docking and maneuvering.

The design has sleeping accommodation for two people, with a double "V"-berth in the bow. The galley is located on the port side just forward of the companionway ladder. The galley is equipped with an ice box. The head is located at the companionway on the starboard.

Operational history
In a 2010 review Steve Henkel wrote, "... these little shallow-draft racer-cruisers were built in the three years ending in 1982. O'Day may have hoped that they could start some fleets for one-design club racing, but the boat is probably a bit too small for that purpose, given her relatively short cockpit and lack of buoyancy aft (insufficit to support much crew weight). Best features: The O'Day 19's high-aspect-ratio rig and centerboard, low wetted surface, and light weight should make her fast in light air—assuming a small crew. Worst features: the O'Day’s average PHRF of around 218 compared to much higher numbers for her comp[etitor]s would indicate that she is a faster boat. This might be the case in light air with a small crew, or in heavy air if the skipper piles plenty of beef along the rail. Otherwise her relatively light ballast (300 lbs compared with up to 400 for her comp[etitor]s) installed high in the boat would cause her to be too tender to be fast in all conditions. Other faults include an awkward mainsheet lead (with no traveler to keep the boom in close in a breeze) and a rudder whose bottom is lower than the keel with board up (asking for trouble in shoal waters)."

See also
List of sailing boat types

References

Keelboats
1970s sailboat type designs
Sailing yachts
Trailer sailers
Sailboat type designs by John Deknatel
Sailboat type designs by C. Raymond Hunt Associates
Sailboat types built by O'Day Corp.